The Zambezian Baikiaea woodlands is an ecoregion in Africa. It includes dry deciduous forest and woodland, thicket, and grassland, dominated by the tree Baikiaea plurijuga. The ecoregion has a semi-arid climate, and is a transition between more humid miombo woodlands to the north, and the drier Kalahari Acacia-Baikiaea woodlands to the south.

References

Afrotropical ecoregions
Ecoregions of Angola
Ecoregions of Botswana
Ecoregions of Namibia
Ecoregions of Zambia
Ecoregions of Zimbabwe
Tropical and subtropical grasslands, savannas, and shrublands
Zambezian region